Damberg is a surname. Notable people with the surname include: 

Britt Damberg (1937–2019), Swedish singer and actress
Mikael Damberg (born 1971), Swedish politician
Pētõr Damberg (1909–1987), Livonian linguist, poet, and teacher

See also
Danberg